Emera Incorporated is a publicly traded Canadian multinational energy holding company based in Halifax, Nova Scotia. Created in 1998 during the privatization of Nova Scotia Power, a provincial Crown corporation, Emera now invests in regulated electricity generation as well as transmission and distribution across North America and the Caribbean.

History

Emera was created out of the privatization of the provincial Crown corporation Nova Scotia Power Incorporated (NSPI). On December 2, 1998, NSPI shareholders voted to restructure the company to create a holding company which would be shareholder-owned, with the regulated utility being a wholly owned subsidiary of the holding company. On December 9, 1998, NSPI received approval to establish NS Power Holdings Incorporated and NSPI shareholders exchanged their shares in NSPI for shares in NS Power Holdings Inc. on a one-to-one basis on January 1, 1999. Common shares in NS Power Holdings Inc. began trading on the Toronto Stock Exchange and Montreal Stock Exchange on January 6, 1999. The NS Power Holdings Inc. name was changed to Emera Incorporated on July 17, 2000.

In 2013, Emera acquired the Bridgeport Energy, Rumford Power, and Tiverton Power plants from Capital Power Corporation for $541 million.

On September 4, 2015, Emera announced the acquisition of TECO Energy, a utility company based in Tampa, Florida, whose holdings include Tampa Electric, Peoples Gas (no relation to the Chicago-based company of the same name), and New Mexico Gas.  Emera paid $10.4 billion for TECO. The deal closed in July 2016.

Subsidiaries

Electric Utilities 

 Nova Scotia Power is a vertically integrated utility in Nova Scotia, with 500,000 customers, and 2487 MW of generating capacity
 Tampa Electric, a vertically integrated utility in the Tampa Bay area of Florida, with 725,000 customers and 4700 MW of generating capacity
 Emera Caribbean is a utility that serves 227,000 customers in the Caribbean.  Its subsidiaries include: 
 Light and Power Holdings - LUCELEC in St. Lucia
 Barbados Light and Power Company in Barbados
 Grand Bahama Power Company in The Bahamas
 Dominica Electricity Services in Dominica

Former Subsidiaries
 Emera Maine was a utility with 130,000 customers in Maine, created through the merger of Bangor Hydro (acquired in 2002) and Maine Public Service (acquired in 2010). In 2020, Emera Maine was sold to another Canadian utility, ENMAX of Calgary, Alberta. Under ENMAX, the former Emera Maine territory now trades as Versant Power.

Natural Gas Utilities 

 New Mexico Gas is a natural gas utility in New Mexico with 513,000 customers.
 Peoples Gas is a natural gas utility in Florida with 365,000 customers.

Other Subsidiaries 

 Emera Energy trades and markets natural gas and electricity.  Power plants owned include:
Bear Swamp Hydroelectric Power Station, a 600 MW hydro-electric plant in northern Massachusetts, 50% owned by Emera
 Emera New Brunswick runs the Brunswick Pipeline, a natural gas pipeline through New Brunswick, Canada
 Emera has a 12.5% ownership stake in the Maritimes and Northeast Pipeline

See also
 Fortis Inc., Another Canadian Maritime Multinational Energy Operator/Investor begun as Newfoundland Light & Power Co.

References

External links
 Official site

 
Companies listed on the Toronto Stock Exchange
Electric power companies of Canada
S&P/TSX 60
Companies based in Halifax, Nova Scotia
Natural gas pipeline companies
Natural gas companies of Canada
Year of establishment missing